Bill Stilwell is a Canadian nature writer. He is the author of three national best-sellers: Manitoba Wild, Manitoba Naturally, and Scenic Secrets of Manitoba. Stilwell is the only rural Manitoba author who has had two or more national best-sellers while continuing to live here.

Awards
These books have received the following awards:
Manitoba Wild - Outdoor Writers of Canada Book Award 
Manitoba Wild - Tourism "Product Development Award" 
Manitoba Naturally - "Canadian Outdoor Book of the Year"

References

Living people
People from Neepawa, Manitoba
Brandon University alumni
Canadian nature writers
Writers from Manitoba
Non-fiction outdoors writers
Year of birth missing (living people)